Toohey is a surname of Irish origin. Notable people with the surname include:

Cynthia Toohey (born 1934), American politician
John Peter Toohey (1879–1946), American writer and publicist
John Toohey (judge) (1930–2015), Australian judge and Justice of the High Court of Australia
John Toohey (politician) (1839–1903), Irish-born Australian politician and brewer
Meghan Toohey, folk-rock singer/songwriter
Peter Toohey (born 1954), Australian cricketer

Fictional characters:
Ellsworth Toohey, character in Ayn Rand's novel The Fountainhead

References